Lithophane thujae, the cedar pinion, is a species of cutworm or dart moth in the family Noctuidae. It is found in North America.

The MONA or Hodges number for Lithophane thujae is 9899.1.

References

Further reading

External links

 

thujae
Articles created by Qbugbot
Moths described in 2000